Philippe Henri Xavier Antoine de Gaulle (born 28 December 1921) is a French retired admiral and senator. He is the eldest child and only son of General Charles de Gaulle, the first president of the French Fifth Republic, and his wife Yvonne. He is the only living child of De Gaulle.

Early life
De Gaulle was born in Paris on 28 December 1921 and was baptised on 8 June of the following year in the Church of St. Francis Xavier in the 7th Arrondissement. He was educated at the Collège Stanislas de Paris, where his father had also studied, and subsequently joined the French Navy. According to Charles de Gaulle, Philippe was named after his family ancestor Jean-Baptiste de Gaulle, though it has been claimed that he was named after General Philippe Pétain, of whom his father was a great admirer.

Free French naval officer

A student at the École Navale at the time of the invasion of France in 1940, he did not hear his father's appeal of 18 June, but escaped to the United Kingdom and declared his allegiance to Free France, joining the Free French Naval Forces. During the Second World War he fought in the Channel campaign and in the Battle of the Atlantic. Promoted to sub-lieutenant in 1943, de Gaulle participated in the Battle of France (1944–1945) as a platoon commander of the Régiment Blindé de Fusiliers-Marins, an armoured regiment of marines of the 2nd Armoured Division. On 25 August 1944, he participated in the liberation of Paris and was sent from the Montparnasse Station to carry the order to obtain the surrender of the Germans entrenched at the Palais Bourbon in the premises of the National Assembly. Risking being shot if things went wrong, he negotiated among them, alone and unarmed. He fought in the Vosges during the winter of 1944–1945.

Postwar naval career

De Gaulle was promoted to lieutenant in 1948, and received in 1952 the command of the naval flottille 6F. He was promoted to corvette captain (lieutenant-commander) in 1956 and to frigate captain (commander) in 1961, commanding the fast frigate (Escorteur Rapide) Le Picard (1960–1961). He pursued a military career as a French Naval Aviation pilot and was made naval aviation commander of the Paris Region (1964–1966). Promoted to capitaine de vaisseau rank in 1966, he commanded the missile-launching frigate Suffren from 1967 to 1968. In 1971 he was promoted to rear-admiral (contre-amiral), becoming commander of the naval group of test and measurement ("GROUPEM") (1973–1974) where he hoisted his flag on the Missile Range Instrumentation and Command and Control ship Henri Poincaré. He was then commander of aviation maritime patrol (ALPATMAR) from 1974 to 1975 and was promoted to vice-admiral (vice-amiral) in 1975. From 1976 to 1977 he was Commander of the Atlantic Fleet and was elevated to squadron vice-admiral (vice-amiral d'escadre) in 1977. 

Promoted to admiral in 1980, he finished his military career as Inspector General of the Navy, retiring in 1982.

Politician
From 1986 to 2004 (reelected in 1995), de Gaulle served as a senator from Paris in the RPR and UMP. Near the end of the 1960s, a "legitimist" Gaullist party led by Joseph Bozzi advocated de Gaulle as the only legitimate heir of Gaullism. De Gaulle's influence, however, remained very low.

Personal life

On 30 December 1947 de Gaulle married Henriette de Montalembert Cers (1 January 1929 – 22 June 2014), a descendant of the family of the Marquis de Montalembert. The marriage was blessed by Admiral Georges Thierry d'Argenlieu, one of the commanders of the Free French Naval Forces during the war. The couple had four sons:

Charles de Gaulle II (Dijon, 25 September 1948), corporate lawyer, first MEP in the UDF and RPR labels, he joined the National Front in May 1999.
Yves de Gaulle (Rabat, Morocco, 1 September 1951), technocrat, general secretary of GDF SUEZ.
Jean de Gaulle (Bourg-en-Bresse, 13 June 1953), former deputy of Deux-Sèvres and Paris (1986–2007, resigned), he became the master to the Court of Auditors.
Pierre de Gaulle (Suresnes, 20 June 1963)

De Gaulle turned 100 in December 2021.

Honours
Grand Cross of the Legion of Honour (2005) (Grand Officer – 1980)
Grand Cross of the National Order of Merit
War Cross 1939–1945
Medal of Aeronautics

Charles never appointed his son a Companion of the Liberation, probably to avoid being open to possible accusations of nepotism. Yet, in the opinion of some Gaullists and companions, Philippe would not have been undeserving of this honour, given his immediate engagement in Free France and his service in the army for five years, often at the forefront. Nor did Philippe's father award his son the medal of the Resistance.

References

1921 births
Living people
French people of Breton descent
Politicians from Paris
French Navy admirals
Children of national leaders of France
French Senators of the Fifth Republic
École Navale alumni
French Navy personnel of World War II
Free French Naval Forces officers
Philippe
Recipients of the Aeronautical Medal
Grand Croix of the Légion d'honneur
Grand Cross of the Ordre national du Mérite
Recipients of the Croix de Guerre 1939–1945 (France)
Senators of Paris
French centenarians
Men centenarians